Neadeloides is a genus of moth of the family Crambidae. It contains only one species, Neadeloides cinerealis, is found in India (Darjeeling).

References

Natural History Museum Lepidoptera genus database

Pyraustinae
Crambidae genera
Monotypic moth genera